National Bolshevism, whose supporters are known as National Bolsheviks and are also colloquially known as Nazbols, is a political movement that combines ultranationalism and Bolshevism.

History and origins

In Germany 

National Bolshevism as a term was first used to describe a faction in the Communist Party of Germany (KPD) and later the Communist Workers' Party of Germany (KAPD) which wanted to ally the insurgent communist movement with dissident nationalist groups in the German army who rejected the Treaty of Versailles. Heinrich Laufenberg and Fritz Wolffheim led the faction and it was primarily based in Hamburg. They were subsequently expelled from the KAPD which Karl Radek justified by stating that it was necessary if the KAPD were to be welcomed into the Third Congress of the Third International. Although the expulsion would likely had happened regardless, as Radek previously dismissed the pair as "National Bolsheviks" (which was the first recorded use of the term).

National Bolshevism was among several early fascist movements in Germany that predate Adolf Hitler's Nazi Party.  During the 1920s, a number of German intellectuals began a dialogue which created a synthesis between radical nationalism (typically referencing Prussianism) and Bolshevism as it existed in the Soviet Union. One of the main figures of this movement was Ernst Niekisch of the Old Social Democratic Party of Germany, who was an editor of Widerstand, a magazine which advocated for National Bolshevik ideology.

Another prominent National Bolshevik movement also existed within the German Youth Movement, led by Karl Otto Paetel. Paetel had been a supporter of the National Socialist German Workers' Party (NSDAP), but eventually became disillusioned with the party as he no longer believed they were genuinely committed to revolutionary activity or socialist economics. In 1930, Paetel formed the Group of Social Revolutionary Nationalists, which sought to forge a third way between the NSDAP and the KPD, encompassing both nationalism and socialist economics. Paetel was especially active in a largely unsuccessful attempt to win over a section of the Hitler Youth to his cause.

Although members of the Nazi Party under Adolf Hitler never took part in Niekisch's National Bolshevik project and typically presented Bolshevism in exclusively negative terms as an alleged "Jewish conspiracy", in the early 1930s there was a parallel tendency within the NSDAP which advocated similar views. This was represented by what has now come to be known as Strasserism. It was initially a faction of the NSDAP led by Hermann Ehrhardt, Otto Strasser and Walther Stennes but broke away in 1930 to found the Combat League of Revolutionary National Socialists, commonly known as the Black Front.

In Russia

Russian Civil War 

As the Russian Civil War dragged on, a number of prominent Whites switched to the Bolshevik side because they saw it as the only hope for restoring greatness to Russia. Amongst these was Professor Nikolai Ustrialov, initially an anti-communist, who came to believe that Bolshevism could be modified to serve nationalistic purposes. His followers, the Smenovekhovtsy (named after a series of articles he published in 1921) Smena vekh (Russian: change of milestones), came to regard themselves as National Bolsheviks, borrowing the term from Niekisch.

Similar ideas were expressed by the Evraziitsi movement and writers such as D. S. Mirsky, and the pro-monarchist Mladorossi. Joseph Stalin's idea of socialism in one country was interpreted as a victory by the National Bolsheviks. Vladimir Lenin, who did not use the term National Bolshevism, identified the Smenovekhovtsy as a tendency of the old Constitutional Democratic Party who saw Russian communism as just an evolution in the process of Russian aggrandisement. He further added that they were a class enemy and warned against communists believing them to be allies.

Co-option of National Bolshevism 
Ustryalov and others sympathetic to the Smenovekhovtsy cause, such as Aleksey Nikolayevich Tolstoy and Ilya Ehrenburg, were eventually able to return to the Soviet Union and following the co-option of aspects of nationalism by Stalin and his ideologue Andrei Zhdanov enjoyed membership of the intellectual elite under the designation non-party Bolsheviks. Similarly, B. D. Grekov's National Bolshevik school of historiography, a frequent target under Lenin, was officially recognised and even promoted under Stalin, albeit after accepting the main tenets of Stalinism. It has been argued that National Bolshevism was the main impetus for the revival of nationalism as an official part of state ideology in the 1930s. Although many of the original proponents of National Bolshevism, such as Ustryalov and members of the Smenovekhovtsy were suppressed and executed during the Great Purge for "anti-Soviet agitation", espionage and other counter-revolutionary activities.

Russian historian Andrei Savin stated that Stalin's policy shifted away from internationalism towards National Bolshevism a view also shared by David Brandenberger and Evgeny Dobrenko.

Aleksandr Solzhenitsyn vs. Eduard Limonov 
The term National Bolshevism has sometimes been applied to Aleksandr Solzhenitsyn and his brand of anti-communism. However, Geoffrey Hosking argues in his History of the Soviet Union that Solzhenitsyn cannot be labelled a National Bolshevik since he was thoroughly anti-Stalinist and wished a revival of Russian culture that would see a greater role for the Russian Orthodox Church, a withdrawal of Russia from its role overseas and a state of international isolationism. Solzhenitsyn and his followers, known as vozrozhdentsy (revivalists), differed from the National Bolsheviks, who were not religious in tone (although not completely hostile to religion) and who felt that involvement overseas was important for the prestige and power of Russia.

There was open hostility between Solzhenitsyn and Eduard Limonov, the head of Russia's unregistered National Bolshevik Party. Solzhenitsyn had described Limonov as "a little insect who writes pornography" and Limonov described Solzhenitsyn as a traitor to his homeland who contributed to the downfall of the Soviet Union. In The Oak and the Calf, Solzhenitsyn openly attacked the notions that the Russians were "the noblest in the world" and that "tsarism and Bolshevism [...] [were] equally irreproachable", defining this as the core of the National Bolshevism to which he was opposed.

National Bolshevik Party 

The current National Bolshevik Party (NBP) was founded in 1992 as the National Bolshevik Front, an amalgamation of six minor groups. The party has always been led by Eduard Limonov. Limonov and extreme right-wing ultranationalist activist Aleksandr Dugin sought to unite far-left and far-right radicals on the same platform, with Dugin viewing national-bolsheviks as a point between communist and fascists, and forced to act in the peripheries of each group. The group's early policies and actions show some alignment and sympathy with radical nationalist groups, albeit while still holding to the tenets of a form of Marxism that Dugin defined as "Marx minus Feuerbach, i. e. minus evolutionism and sometimes appearing inertial humanism", but a split occurred in the 2000s which changed this to an extent. This led to the party moving further left in Russia's political spectrum, and led to members of the party denouncing Dugin and his group as fascists. Dugin subsequently developed close ties to the Kremlin and served as an adviser to senior Russian official Sergey Naryshkin.

Initially critical of Vladimir Putin, Limonov at first somewhat liberalized the NBP and joined forces with leftist and liberal groups in Garry Kasparov's United Civil Front to fight Putin. However, he later expressed support of Putin following the outbreak of the Russo-Ukrainian War.

In other countries 
The Franco-Belgian Parti Communautaire National-Européen shares National Bolshevism's desire for the creation of a united Europe as well as many of the NBP's economic ideas. French political figure Christian Bouchet has also been influenced by the idea.

In 1944, Indian nationalist leader Subhas Chandra Bose called for "a synthesis between National Socialism and communism" to take root in India.

That same year, the new leadership of the Israeli paramilitary organization Lehi declared its support for National Bolshevism, a break from the group's fascist outlook under its previous leader Avraham Stern.

Some have described the Serbian Radical Party, the Bulgarian Attack party, the Slovenian National Party, the Macedonian Levica and the Greater Romania Party as "National Bolshevik" for blending much of their respective countries' far-right rhetoric with traditional left-wing stances such as socialised economies, anti-imperialism and defense of historical communist rule. The Serbian Radical Party in particular has given support to leaders such as Muammar Gaddafi, Saddam Hussein and current Venezuelan President Nicolas Maduro. The Greater Romania Party on the other hand was founded by Corneliu Vadim Tudor, described as the "Court Poet of Nicolae Ceaușescu", and has been seen as a continuation of the latter's ideology with a right-wing veneer.

In July 2021, the leader of the American Traditionalist Worker Party Heimbach announced his intention to reform the party along National Bolshevik lines.

In Ukraine, the Progressive Socialist Party of Ukraine, a National Bolshevik political party, was banned on March 20, 2022

See also 

 Black Front
 Essence of Time
 Eurasia Party
 Fascism
 Foundations of Geopolitics, book by Aleksandr Dugin
 The Fourth Political Theory, book by Aleksandr Dugin
 Juche
 National Anarchism
 National Bolshevik Front
 National Communism
 National syndicalism
 Socialism with Chinese characteristics
 Neosocialism
 Neo-Sovietism
 Neo-Stalinism
 Nouvelle Droite
 Radical centrism
 Rashism
 Red Fascism
 Red–green–brown alliance
 Russian nationalism
 Sankarism
 Socialist patriotism
 Sorelianism
 Strasserism
 Syncretic politics
 Third International Theory
 Third Position
 Titoism
 Ultranationalism

References

External links 

 The Other Russia - official blog of Russian National-Bolsheviks
 Who Are the National-Bolsheviks? by Andrei Dmitriev
 An interview with national-bolshevik Beness Aijo
 Niekisch Translation Project
 Arplan - National Bolshevism
 National Bolshevism UK

 
Conservative Revolutionary movement
Counterculture of the 1990s
Communism
Political ideologies
Political Internet memes
Russian nationalism
Syncretic political movements
Third Position
Fascism